Point Alden is an ice-covered point  in Antarctica with rock exposures along the seaward side. The point marks the western side of the entrance to Commonwealth Bay and the division between Adélie Coast and George V Coast in Antarctica. The point was discovered on January 30, 1840, by the USEE under Lt. Charles Wilkes, and named by him for Lt. James Alden of the expedition's flagship Vincennes.

References

Further reading 
Defense Mapping Agency  1992, Sailing Directions (planning Guide) and (enroute) for Antarctica, P 412
Kurt Stüwe, Robin Oliver, Geological history of Adélie Land and King George V Land, Antarctica: Evidence for a polycyclic metamorphic evolution, Precambrian Research Volume 43, Issue 4, June 1989, Pages 317–334, https://doi.org/10.1016/0301-9268(89)90063-6

External links 
 Point Alden on USGS website
 Point Alden on AADC website
 Point Alden on SCAR website
 Point Alden on mindat.org

Headlands of George V Land
Headlands of Adélie Land